Jürgen Fassbender (born 28 May 1948) is a retired German tennis player.

On the ATP Tour, Fassbender won three singles and 15 doubles titles. His best Grand Slam singles result was reaching the quarterfinals at the 1973 Wimbledon Championships. In doubles, he reached the semifinals of the 1973 French Open and the 1973 and 1975 Wimbledon Championships.

Between 1968 and 1979, he played in 23 ties for the German Davis Cup team and compiled a record of 20 wins and 14 losses. Best team result was winning the European Zone and reaching the Inter-Zonal semifinal in 1968.

Career finals

Singles: 6 (3 titles, 3 runner-ups)

Doubles: 35 (16 titles, 19 runner-ups)

References

External links

 
 
 

1948 births
Living people
People from Rhein-Erft-Kreis
Sportspeople from Cologne (region)
West German male tennis players
Tennis players at the 1968 Summer Olympics
Tennis people from North Rhine-Westphalia